Peru–Sweden refers to the bilateral relations between Peru and Sweden. In November 2016, the Swedish embassy in Lima restarted its activities. However, the embassy closed again in October 2022 and the Swedish embassy in Santiago, Chile is accredited to Peru. Peru has an embassy in Stockholm.

History
The original Swedish embassy in Lima was established in 1940. The building was redesigned in 1956, by the architect J. Fussing.

One major issue in Peruvian-Swedish relations has been the matter of the Paracas textiles. A large collection of textile artifacts originating from the ancient Paracas culture, located in modern Peru, were illegally smuggled out by the Swedish diplomat Sven Karell in the 1930s, contravening Peruvian laws on the export of antiquities. After years of attempting to retrieve the textiles, kept in Gothenburg, in 2013 Peruvian authorities were successful in negotiating a deal for their gradual return. This exchange began in 2014, with some of the textiles put on display in Peru. The plan is to have the entire collection, consisting of 89 separate pieces, returned by 2021.

See also
 Foreign relations of Peru
 Foreign relations of Sweden
 List of ambassadors of Peru to Sweden
 List of ambassadors of Sweden to Peru

References

 
Sweden
Bilateral relations of Sweden